Dong Yanfeng (born 11 February 1996) is a Chinese footballer who currently plays for Chinese Super League side Dalian Professional.

Club career
Dong Yanfeng would play for the Dalian Aerbin (now known as Dalian Professional) youth team before being selected by the Liaoning Football Association who were allowed to field a team called Liaoning Youth within 2013 China League Two season. Starting his professional football career with them, on 12 May 2013, he scored his first senior goal in a 3–3 home draw with Shenyang Dongjin. When the season ended he would remain with Liaoning as they participated within the football at the 2013 National Games of China, in a tournament that they won.

Dong returned to Dalian in the summer of 2014 and was promoted to the first team, however he failed to establish himself and was returned to the reserve team in 2015. He was promoted to the first team again in the summer of 2016 after the club changed their name as Dalian Yifang. On 31 July 2016, he made his debut in a 1–0 away defeat to Nei Mongol Zhongyou. He scored his first goal for the club on 24 September 2016 in a 2–0 home win over Guizhou Zhicheng. Dong played only one minute in the 2017 league season as Dalian Yifang won the title of China League One and promoted to the first tier. On 29 April 2018, he made his Super League debut in a 1–0 away defeat against Shanghai Greenland Shenhua, coming on as a substitute for Zheng Jianfeng in the 70th minute.

Career statistics
.

Honours

Club
Dalian Yifang/ Dalian Professional
China League One: 2017

References

External links
 

1996 births
Living people
Chinese footballers
Footballers from Dalian
Dalian Professional F.C. players
Chinese Super League players
China League One players
China League Two players
Association football defenders